This is a list of castles and chateaux located in the Hradec Králové Region of the Czech Republic.

A
 Adršpach Castle
 Aichelburg Castle
 Albrechtice nad Orlicí Castle
 Arnultovice Chateau

B
 Barchov Chateau
 Bílé Poličany Chateau
 Bolehošťská Lhota Chateau
 Bolkov Castle
 Borohrádek Chateau
 Brada Castle
 Bradlec Castle
 Bradlo Castle
 Břecštejn Castle
 Bystrý Castle

C
 Cerekvice nad Bystřic Chateauí
 Chábory Castle
 Chlumec nad Cidlinou Castle
 Choustníkovo Hradiště Castle
 Chvalkovice Chateau
 Častolovice Chateau
 Černíkovice Chateau
 Červená Hora Castle
 Čeřov Chateau

D
 Dětenice Chateau
 Dobřany Castle
 Dobřenice Chateau
 Dolní Adršpach Chateau
 Dolní Přím Chateau
 Doudleby nad Orlicí Chateau

F
 Fořt Chateau
 Frymburk Castle

H

 Hlodný Castle
 Hlušice Chateau
 Hoděčín Chateau
 Holovousy Chateau
 Horní Maršov Chateau
 Horní Vlčice Castle
 Hořice Chateau
 Hořiněves Chateau
 Hrad u Božanova Castle
 Hradec Králové Castle
 Hrádek u Nechanic Chateau
 Humprecht Chateau

J
 Jaroměř Castle
 Jeřice Chateau
 Jičín Chateau
 Jičíněves Chateau

K

 Kalthaus Castle
 Kamenice Chateau
 Karlova Koruna Chateau
 Kopidlno Chateau
 Kost Castle
 Kostelec nad Orlicí Chateau
 Kozlov Castle
 Kratonohy Chateau
 Kumburk Castle
 Kvasiny Chateau

L
 Lázně Bělohrad Chateau
 Libosad Chateau

M
 Meziměstí Chateau
 Miletín Castle
 Miletín Chateau
 Milíčeves Chateau
 Mladějov Chateau
 Myštěves Chateau

N
 Náchod Chateau
 Neděliště Chateau
 Nové Město nad Metují Chateau
 Nový Bydžov Castle
 Nový Hrad Castle

O
 Obora Chateau
 Opočno Chateau

P
 Pařez Castle
 Pecka Castle
 Pěčín Castle
 Podhůří Chateau
 Podlesí Chateau Chateau
 Potštejn Castle
 Potštejn Chateau
 Přestavlky Chateau
 Purkhybl Castle

R
 Ratibořice Chateau
 Rechenburk Castle
 Rohoznice Chateau
 Rokytnice v Orlických horách Chateau
 Rotemberk Castle
 Rychmberk Castle
 Rychnov nad Kněžnou Chateau
 Rýzmburk Castle

S
 Skalka Chateau, Podbřezí
 Skály (u Broumova) Castle
  Chateau
 Skřivany Chateau
 Skuhrov Castle
 Sloupno Chateau
 Smidary Chateau
 Smiřice Chateau
 Sobčice Chateau
 Solnice Chateau
 Staré Hrady Chateau
 Stárkov Chateau
 Stěžery Chateau
 Stračov Chateau
 Střmen Castle
 Šluspárk Castle

T
 Teplice nad Metují Chateau
 Týniště nad Orlicí Chateau

V
 Velešov Castle
 Velichovky Chateau
 Veliš Castle
 Velký Vřešťov Castle
 Vízmburk Castle
 Vlčice Chateau
 Vlčinec Castle
 Vokšice Chateau
 Volanice Chateau
 Vražba Castle
 Vrchlabí Chateau
 Vysoké Veselí Chateau
 Výrov Castle

Z
 Železnice Castle
 Žíreč Chateau

See also
 List of castles in the Czech Republic
 List of castles in Europe
 List of castles

External links 
 Castles, Chateaux, and Ruins 
 Czech Republic - Manors, Castles, Historical Towns
 Hrady.cz 

 
Hradec Kralove